The 2006 Gateshead Council election was held on Thursday 4 May 2006 to elect members of Gateshead Metropolitan Borough Council, in England. It was held on the same day as other English local elections. One third of the council was up for election, with the poll coming two years after boundary changes in the previous election which had necessitated the whole council facing voters at once. The Labour Party retained control, and a Liberal Democrat gain from Labour in Winlaton and High Spen was the only change in the level of party representation on the council. Turnout was 37.0%, lower than the 47.7% achieved in 2004. In total, 79 candidates stood for election, with the Labour and Conservative parties standing for all of the seats. The Liberal Democrats stood in all but two wards where the Liberal Party stood instead. There were also eight British National Party candidates, one UK Independence Party candidate and four independents.

Overall result

Ward results

References

2006 English local elections
2006
21st century in Tyne and Wear